Stora Vika is a locality situated in Nynäshamn Municipality, Stockholm County, Sweden with 651 inhabitants in 2010.

References 

Populated places in Nynäshamn Municipality